"Right Now" is the debut single by American pop punk group SR-71 from their debut studio album, Now You See Inside. The song reached number two on the Billboard Modern Rock Tracks chart. It remained in the top 10 in on the chart for 11 consecutive weeks and became the biggest hit of the band's career, leading to many critics labeling the band as a one-hit wonder.

Meaning
Mitch Allan explained what "Right Now" is about in a 2000 interview:

"It's about when you meet a girl and you like her and she's a great lay, and she wants more than just sex out of the relationship and you don't. You end up fighting and arguing all the time about the same thing, but also you don't want to break up with her."

Appearances in other media
The song is featured on the soundtracks to the 2000 film Loser, and the 2001 video games, Splashdown and MTV Sports: T.J. Lavin's Ultimate BMX.
The song is featured in the game Major League Baseball 2K9.
The song was used in the films She Gets What She Wants, Dude, Where's My Car (including its trailer), and the trailers for Harold & Kumar Go to White Castle and Old School.
The song was used for a commercial of Fetch!.
The song is the official theme song for the nationally syndicated radio program The Schnitt Show, hosted by Todd Schnitt. Variations of the song are played at the top of each hour, and as bumper music before and after commercial breaks.

The band performed the song on the second episode of the short-lived 2000 NBC primetime soap opera Titans.

Music videos
Two music videos for "Right Now" were shot. Version 1 features the band performing the song on a live setlist.

The second music video for "Right Now" features SR-71 playing the song in front of fans, intercut with scenes of the band running from a mob of fangirls. The second video ends as it is revealed that it was all a dream. Version 2 of the video got more heavy airplay on MTV than Version 1.

Charts

References

External links

2000 songs
2000 debut singles
SR-71 (band) songs
RCA Records singles
Songs written by Mitch Allan
Songs written by Butch Walker
Music videos directed by Marcos Siega
Songs about drugs